Osmunda greenlandica is an extinct species of ferns in the genus Osmunda.

References

Osmundales